Craig Molloy (born 26 April 1986) is a Scottish footballer who plays as a midfielder for Cambuslang Rangers, in the Scottish Junior Football Association, West Region.

Career

Molloy began his career in the youth teams of St Mirren before progressing to the senior side and making 21 appearances in the First Division and the SPL.

Molloy went on loan to Second Division side Stirling Albion on 18 September 2008, until the end of December after Stirling lost both John O'Neill and Liam Corr to injury. Molloy had also been on loan at Forthbank towards the end of the previous season as well.

He also spent a period on loan to Stenhousemuir, before signing with the Warriors permanently in July 2009.  He then signed with Brechin City for the 2010–11 season. Molloy spent six seasons at Brechin and was made club captain under manager Ray McKinnon.

Molloy signed for Hurlford United in June 2016, then moved to fellow Junior side Cambuslang Rangers in October 2017.

Family
His brother Thomas Molloy, (born 23 January 1983), had a spell as YTS with hometown club Morton on leaving school. From there he won a move to Ayr United making one league appearance before dropping to Junior football. He has managed Greenock Juniors since June 2017.

References

External links

Living people
1986 births
Footballers from Greenock
Scottish footballers
St Mirren F.C. players
Stirling Albion F.C. players
Stenhousemuir F.C. players
Scottish Football League players
Scottish Premier League players
Association football midfielders
Brechin City F.C. players
Hurlford United F.C. players
Cambuslang Rangers F.C. players
Scottish Professional Football League players
Scottish Junior Football Association players